Nikolay Nikolayevich Spinyov (born 30 May 1974 in Rostov-on-Don) is a Russian rower. He won a gold medal at the 2004 Summer Olympics.

External links 
Profile on sports-reference.com

1974 births
Russian male rowers
Rowers at the 1996 Summer Olympics
Rowers at the 2004 Summer Olympics
Rowers at the 2008 Summer Olympics
Olympic rowers of Russia
Medalists at the 2004 Summer Olympics
Olympic medalists in rowing
Olympic gold medalists for Russia
Sportspeople from Rostov-on-Don
Living people